The Mycosphaerellaceae are a family of sac fungi. They affect many common plants, such as eucalyptus, the myrtle family, and the Proteaceae. They have a widespread distribution.

Taxonomy 
The following genera are included in this family:

References

Further reading

External links 
 WORMS entry
 EOL entry
 ZipcodeZoo entry
 MycoBank entry

 
Dothideomycetes families
Taxa named by Gustav Lindau
Taxa described in 1897